Frank Riethmann (born 9 December 1975) is a German former professional footballer who played as a midfielder. He represented the Germany U20 national team at the 1995 FIFA World Youth Championship.

References

External links

1975 births
Living people
German footballers
Association football midfielders
Germany youth international footballers
Bundesliga players
Borussia Dortmund players
Borussia Dortmund II players